The Blackstaff Press is a publishing company in Newtownards, County Down, Northern Ireland. Founded in 1971, it publishes printed books on a range of subjects (mainly, but not exclusively, of Irish interest) and, since 2011, has also published e-books. It receives financial support from the Arts Council of Northern Ireland.

The Blackstaff Press was acquired by the Baird Group in 1995; it was sold to Colourpoint Creative Limited in 2017.

References

External links
Official website

1971 establishments in Northern Ireland
Book publishing companies of Northern Ireland
Companies based in Newtownards
Publishing companies established in 1971